The National Day of Remembrance and Action on Violence Against Women, also known informally as White Ribbon Day (Jour du Ruban Blanc), is a day commemorated in Canada each December 6, the anniversary of the 1989 École Polytechnique massacre, in which armed student Marc Lépine murdered fourteen women and injured fourteen others in the name of "fighting feminism". The commemoration date was established by the Parliament of Canada in 1991. The legislation was introduced in the House of Commons as a private member's bill by Dawn Black, Member of Parliament for New Westminster-Burnaby, British Columbia, and received all-party support.

Canadian flags on all federal buildingsincluding the Peace Tower on Parliament Hill in Ottawa, Ontarioare flown at half-mast on December 6.  Canadians are encouraged to observe a minute of silence on December 6 and to wear a white ribbon (or a purple ribbon) as a commitment to end violence against women.

The victims of the 1989 massacre were Geneviève Bergeron, 21; Hélène Colgan, 23; Nathalie Croteau, 23; Barbara Daigneault, 22; Anne-Marie Edward, 21; Maud Haviernick, 29; Barbara Klucznik, 31; Maryse Laganière, 25; Maryse Leclair, 23; Anne-Marie Lemay, 22; Sonia Pelletier, 23; Michèle Richard, 21; Anne St-Arneault, 23; and Annie Turcotte, 21.

In response to the event, many Canadians have worked hard to establish memorial sites all across the country to ensure that people will become more aware of the incident that occurred. This is intended to force society to recognize how often violence occurs towards women and to appreciate the lives of the women who were killed. Feminism advocates and activists trying to stop violence directed towards women have shown concern about using the massacre to solely represent violence against women.

The day is aimed to examine the power dynamics between men and women. The news took the ascribed perspective of the killer having mental problems. This effectively dismissed feminist analyses stating that the killer went to this extent to proclaim his anti-feminist opinion. Every act that exists on the spectrum of violence against women happens due to women being viewed as less human than men. That is why the National Day of Remembrance and Action on Violence Against Woman stands for more than simply one massacre. It stands for awareness and change against the violence that occurs to women all around the world at the hands of men. Thirty-five percent of women worldwide have experienced physical and/or sexual intimate partner violence or non-partner sexual violence, according to the United Nations.

See also

 International Day for the Elimination of Violence against Women on November 25
 Public holidays in Canada
 Stop Violence Against Women, a campaign of Amnesty International
 White Ribbon Campaign

References

External links
National Day of Remembrance and Action on Violence Against  Women at Status of Women Canada
 http://www.swc-cfc.gc.ca/commemoration/vaw-vff/remembrance-commemoration-en.html
 http://www.osstf11.com/news/event-658.php
 https://web.archive.org/web/20141208055319/http://ywcacanada.ca/en/pages/rose/about
 

1991 introductions
Annual events in Canada
December observances
Feminist protests
Violence against women in Canada
Winter events in Canada
1991 establishments in Canada